Korey Williams (born July 11, 1987) is an American football wide receiver who is currently a free agent. He attended Alfred Lawless High School in New Orleans, Louisiana. Williams first enrolled at Paul Quinn College before transferring to Northwestern Oklahoma State University. He has also been a member of the Omaha Beef, BC Lions and Saskatchewan Roughriders.

Professional career

Omaha Beef
Williams started the 2012 Indoor Football League season with the Omaha Beef before being released.

Sioux Falls Storm
Williams was signed by the Sioux Falls Storm of the Indoor Football League and had 1,329 all purpose yards and 18 touchdowns in 10 games during the 2012 season.

BC Lions
Williams was signed by the BC Lions on May 13, 2013. He was released by the Lions on July 15, 2014.

Saskatchewan Roughriders
Williams was signed by the Saskatchewan Roughriders on July 29, 2014. He was released by the Roughriders on September 9, 2015.

Sioux Falls Storm
On November 3, 2015, Williams returned to the Sioux Falls Storm. Following the season, Williams was named First Team All-IFL as a kick returner. He was also named the IFL Special Teams Player of the Year.

References

External links
BC Lions profile 
Saskatchewan Roughriders bio 
Just Sports Stats
Fanbase profile

Living people
1987 births
Players of American football from New Orleans
Players of Canadian football from New Orleans
American football wide receivers
Canadian football wide receivers
African-American players of American football
African-American players of Canadian football
Northwestern Oklahoma State Rangers football players
Paul Quinn Tigers football players
Omaha Beef players
Sioux Falls Storm players
BC Lions players
Saskatchewan Roughriders players
21st-century African-American sportspeople
20th-century African-American people